Jason Statham (born 26 July 1967) is an English actor. He is known for portraying characters in various action-thriller films who are typically tough, hardboiled, gritty, or violent.

Statham began practising Chinese martial arts, kickboxing, and karate recreationally in his youth while working at local market stalls. An avid footballer and diver, he was a member of Britain's national diving team and competed for England in the 1990 Commonwealth Games. Shortly after, he was asked to model for French Connection, Tommy Hilfiger, and Levi's in various advertising campaigns. His past history working at market stalls inspired his casting in the Guy Ritchie crime films Lock, Stock and Two Smoking Barrels (1998) and Snatch (2000).

The commercial success of these films led Statham to star as Frank Martin in the Transporter trilogy (2002–2008). After starring in a variety of heist and action-thriller films such as The Italian Job (2003), Crank (2006), War (2007), The Bank Job (2008), The Mechanic (2011), Spy (2015), and Mechanic: Resurrection (2016), he established himself as a Hollywood leading man. However, he has also starred in commercially and critically unsuccessful films such as Revolver (2005), Chaos (2005), In the Name of the King (2007), 13 (2010), Blitz (2011), Killer Elite (2011), Hummingbird (2013), and Wild Card (2015). He regained commercial success as a part of the ensemble action series The Expendables (2010–2014) and the Fast & Furious franchise. In the latter, he has played Deckard Shaw in Fast & Furious 6 (2013), Furious 7 (2015), The Fate of the Furious (2017), F9 (2021) and the spin-off Fast & Furious Presents: Hobbs & Shaw (2019). He was credited as a co-producer on Hobbs & Shaw, receiving his first production credit.

Statham's acting has been criticised for lacking depth and variety, but he has also been praised for leading the resurgence of action films during the 2000s and 2010s. According to a BBC News report, his film career from 2002 to 2017 generated an estimated $1.5 billion (£1.1 billion) in ticket sales, making him one of the film industry's most bankable stars.

Early life
Jason Statham was born on 26 July 1967 in Shirebrook, Derbyshire, the son of dancer Eileen (née Yates) and street seller Barry Statham. His father also worked odd jobs as a house painter, coal miner, and singer in the Canary Islands. Statham moved to Great Yarmouth, Norfolk, where he initially chose not to follow his father's career working the local market stalls, instead practising martial arts. He grew up with football player Vinnie Jones, alongside whom he would later act. Jones introduced him to football, and Statham went on to play for the local grammar school (1978–1983), which he had attended since age 11, a passion that he shared with diving. He practised daily in perfecting his diving techniques, and was a member of Britain's National Swimming Squad for 12 years. He competed for England at the 1990 Commonwealth Games in the 10 metre, 3 metre, and 1 metre competitions. He said in a 2003 interview with IGN that his time with the national squad was "a great experience" and one that "teaches you discipline, focus, and certainly keeps you out of trouble".

Statham's life in the media began when he was spotted by the agency Sports Promotions specialising in sports modelling while he was training at London's Crystal Palace National Sports Centre. He was also signed by Tommy Hilfiger, Griffin, and Levi's for various modelling contracts during their 1996 spring/summer collections. In 1997, he became a model for the clothing brand French Connection. A spokesperson for the high street clothing chain said, "We chose Jason because we wanted our model to look like a normal guy. His look is just right for now: very masculine and not too male-modelly." However, he was still forced to follow in his father's footsteps as a street seller to make ends meet, stating that he sold "fake perfume and jewellery on street corners". He made small appearances in a few music videos, including "Comin' On" by The Shamen in 1993, "Run to the Sun" by Erasure in 1994, and "Dream a Little Dream of Me" by The Beautiful South in 1995.

Career

2000–2010: Rise to prominence

While working as a model for French Connection, he was introduced to fledgling British director Guy Ritchie who was developing a film project and needed to fill the role of a street-wise con artist. After learning about Statham's past as a black market salesman, Ritchie cast him to play the role of "Bacon" in his 1998 crime comedy thriller Lock, Stock and Two Smoking Barrels. The movie was well received by both critics and audiences, and helped put Statham in the public eye. For his role in the film he was paid UK £5,000. Statham's second collaboration with Ritchie came in the 2000 film Snatch, playing the role of "Turkish". Cast alongside popular actors Brad Pitt, Dennis Farina, and Benicio del Toro, the movie earned more than $80 million in box-office revenue. For his role in Snatch, he was paid UK £15,000, 3 times the amount of his first film. Statham was able to break into Hollywood and appeared in two movies in 2001: the science fiction action horror film Ghosts of Mars and the science fiction martial arts action film The One.

Statham was offered more film roles, and in 2002 he was cast as the lead role of driver Frank Martin in the action movie The Transporter, written by Luc Besson. He has studied Wing Chun, karate, and kickboxing. The film spawned two sequels, Transporter 2 (2005) and Transporter 3 (2008). He also played supporting roles in Mean Machine (2002), The Italian Job (2003), and Cellular (2004) in which he played the lead villain.

In 2005, Statham was once again cast by Ritchie to star in his new project, Revolver, which was a critical and box office failure. He played a dramatic role in the independent film London in 2006. That same year he played the lead role in the action film Crank. Statham was asked to promote Crank during the 2006 San Diego Comic-Con Convention. In 2008, Statham starred in the British crime thriller The Bank Job and Death Race, a remake of Death Race 2000 (1975). American film critic Armond White hailed Statham's ascension as an action film star. On the occasion of Death Race, White championed Statham's "best track record of any contemporary movie star." Later in 2008, White praised Statham's Transporter 3 as a great example of kinetic pop art. Chris Hewitt of Empire Magazine, noted the film as "a dour, drab affair", but credited the film with "establishing Statham as a new action hero, as at ease with gruff one-liners as he was with Jackie Chan-esque high-kicking".

In 2009, Statham started to develop a new movie written by David Peoples and Janet Peoples. Statham stated "We've got a movie we're trying to do, written by David Peoples and Janet Peoples, in the vein of an old film, The Treasure of the Sierra Madre. It's not a remake or anything, but it's a little bit like that, about relationships and how greed contaminates the relationships these three people have. The working title is The Grabbers." He reprised his role as Chev Chelios in the 2009 sequel Crank: High Voltage.

In 2010, Statham appeared alongside fellow action stars Sylvester Stallone, Jet Li, Dolph Lundgren and Mickey Rourke, among others, in the ensemble action film The Expendables. Statham plays Lee Christmas, a former SAS soldier and expert at close quarters combat using knives. The film was commercially successful, opening at number one at the box office in the United States, the United Kingdom, China and India, and grossed a total of $274 million worldwide.

2011–2015: Commercial expansion

In his first film of 2011, Statham starred in the remake of the 1972 Charles Bronson film, The Mechanic, as Arthur Bishop. A theatrical trailer depicting Statham's character "shooting a man's head off" was banned from circulation by the Advertising Standards Authority for showing excessive violence. His role in The Mechanic was positively reviewed by the critics both in the United States and the United Kingdom. The Guardian praised his performance as possessing a "now-customary efficiency" in attaining "an entertaining hitman thriller". The New York Times noted Statham as "sleek as a bullet"; and the film "a more powerful recharge" of the original. UK newspaper, The Daily Telegraph hailed Statham as "England's best export to action movies in just about forever, a businesslike brute with gentlemanly soul." He returned to British film by starring in the police drama Blitz as Detective Sergeant Tom Brant. The film received mixed reviews with Cath Clake of The Guardian reviewing it as "not half bad" and "oddly entertaining". He was then cast in the action film Killer Elite. The film was based on real events, which were the subject of Sir Ranulph Fiennes' novel The Feather Men. Statham played an assassin named Danny who comes out of retirement to save an old friend, played by Robert De Niro. The film grossed returned a negative budget, and was panned by the critics.

In August 2011, he began filming Parker for director Taylor Hackford; the film was released in January 2013. Statham played Parker, the criminal antihero previously played by Mel Gibson in 1999's Payback and by Lee Marvin in 1967's Point Blank (though their characters were given different surnames). A. O. Scott of The New York Times said of the actor in the film: "[Statham], who seems to be made entirely of muscle and scar tissue, is comfortable with his limitations as an actor. His Parker, in any case, is more of an axiom than a fully rounded human being." A 2012 BBC News report estimated that his ten-year film career to date (2002 to 2012) yielded over one billion dollars in the box office, making him one of the industry's most bankable stars. He was signed on to reprise his role as Lee Christmas in The Expendables 2 in 2012.In 2013, Statham had a cameo appearance at the end of Fast & Furious 6 as the brother of the film's antagonist Owen Shaw (Luke Evans). He reprised the character, this time as the main antagonist, in Furious 7, which was released in April 2015. He also starred opposite James Franco in the thriller Homefront, written by Sylvester Stallone, and headlined the British thriller Hummingbird. The latter film was praised by critics for pushing Statham's acting abilities to new heights. His "attempt to develop his 'brand' by trying more adventurous parts" noted by The Guardian's Mark Kermode, "[broadened] his dramatic palette". Statham made a cameo in the 2014 music video Summer of Calvin Harris as one of the car racers. In 2014, he returned as Lee Christmas in The Expendables 3. Although critically panned, the film would go on to gross $215 million against a $90 million budget.

In 2015 he starred in the action comedy Spy alongside Melissa McCarthy, Jude Law, and Rose Byrne. The film, a commercial success, was particularly praised for showcasing Statham's comedic side in contrast to his more serious roles. According to an article by Empire magazine, a Spy 2 was development in late 2015, with more screen time dedicated for Statham's character, Rick Ford. He was nominated for the Critic's Choice Award for Best Actor in a Comedy for his role in Spy.

Statham was offered a three-film contract to reboot the Transporter series in late 2015, but turned it down because he was not given the script before the signing date and unhappy with its compensation package. According to an article by The Guardian, Statham expressed interest in playing James Bond in the upcoming Spectre film. Its author, Steve Rose noted that "there was no doubt Statham can walk the Bond walk. And talking his talk can hardly be an issue with a character whose accent has fluctuated between Sean Connery's Scottish brogue and Timothy Dalton's Welsh." After the interview there were multiple calls from critics and the public to instate him as James Bond in a future film.

2016–present: Continued success
The sequel to his 2011 film The Mechanic was scheduled for production in late 2016 and announced to open as Mechanic: Resurrection. The film went on to become highly commercially successfully in international film markets grossing $109.4 million worldwide. According to Forbes, the film was Statham's "seventh-biggest earner" and most commercially successful solo film venture of his career.

In February 2017, he starred alongside Gal Gadot in a 30-second super bowl advertisement for Wix.com during Super Bowl LI. CNET reported that the advertisement reached 22 million user impressions. Statham was asked to re-join the Fast & Furious franchise once more in 2016. The ensuing film, The Fate of the Furious, was released in April 2017 to commercial success. While the film overall received mixed reviews, Statham was praised for his comedic timing and onscreen chemistry with contemporaries. The film went on to be the third highest-grossing film of 2017 and the 12th highest-grossing film of all time.

Spy 2 was confirmed on 15 February 2018. But later in 2018, Feig explained that although a sequel to Spy could still happen, "there hasn't been any interest from the studio" in the project.

Statham played the lead, former Naval captain Jonas Taylor, in the 2018 action-horror film The Meg, which was released on 10 August. In order to prepare for scenes wherein he swims in shark-infested waters, Statham swam with bull sharks in Fiji. The film would go on to gross $527.8 million worldwide, becoming the highest-grossing U.S.-Chinese co-production of all time.

In 2019, Statham reprised his role as Deckard Shaw again in Fast & Furious Presents: Hobbs & Shaw, a spin-off of the Fast & Furious franchise focusing on his and Dwayne Johnson's characters. The film grossed $758 million worldwide, becoming the tenth highest-grossing film of 2019, and received generally positive reviews from critics, with praise for Statham's performance.

Public image
An article by Adam Gabbatt in The Guardian noted that Statham's character contributions to his industry and film niche are "tough [and] uncompromising". Some critics note his presence as a "defining feature" that signals to movie-goers the content of a film. The same exposé commented, "You know what you're getting with a Jason Statham film. He will beat people up. He will crash cars. He will do an unconvincing American accent."
Statham's impact on the action-thriller genre has been seen by Gabbatt as a replacement of the same undertaken by Arnold Schwarzenegger, Sylvester Stallone, and Jean-Claude Van Damme during their runs as headliners throughout the 1980s and 1990s. Statham himself cites Stallone, Bruce Lee, Paul Newman, Steve McQueen, and Clint Eastwood as his inspirations.

An article by Times Higher Education reported that Manchester University Press commissioned an academic study analysing the impact Statham has had on the British and American film industries from his debut in 1998 to 2018. According to the article, professors Steven Gerrard and Robert Shail are looking to show "the changing face of British cinematic masculinity" into "one that embraces cinema across a wide range of projects, but one that also uses cross-textual media in his output".

In popular media
In 2003, Statham appeared in three British television commercials for the Kit Kat chocolate bar. Described as a "break philosopher", he philosophised about salmon swimming upstream, a Mexican fisherman, and the relative speeds and ages of animals, before ending with a reminder that "taking a break" (alluding to the Kit Kat slogan) is an important part of life.

In the comic book series Ultimate Spider-Man, that series' version of the villain Vulture was rendered by artist Mark Bagley to resemble actor Statham, as per writer Brian Michael Bendis' instructions.

Personal life
Statham has been in a relationship with model Rosie Huntington-Whiteley since 2010. The couple announced their engagement in January 2016. Their son was born in June 2017. Their daughter was born on 2 February 2022. They reside in Beverly Hills, California.

Statham enjoys wakeboarding, jet skiing, wind surfing, and rock climbing. While filming on location in Varna for The Expendables 3, he drove a truck off the road into the Black Sea due to malfunctioning brakes. 

In a 2013 interview with Vanity Fair, he advocated for stunt performers to be given their own Academy Award category: "All of the stunt men—these are the unsung heroes. They really are. Nobody is giving them any credibility. They're risking their necks. And then you've got poncy actors pretending like they're doing [the stunts]."

Filmography

Film

Video games

Music videos

Awards and nominations

Notes

References

External links

 
 Jason Statham at TikTok

1967 births
21st-century English male actors
English male karateka
English practitioners of Brazilian jiu-jitsu
British wushu practitioners
Commonwealth Games competitors for England
Divers at the 1990 Commonwealth Games
English divers
English male kickboxers
English male film actors
English male models
English male voice actors
Hollywood United players
Living people
Male actors from Kent
People from Shirebrook
People from Sydenham, London
Association footballers not categorized by position
Association football players not categorized by nationality